Philadelphia Freeway is the debut studio album from Philadelphia rapper Freeway. It was released under Roc-A-Fella Records and Def Jam Recordings. The most successful single was "Flipside", which featured Peedi Crakk. The single debuted at #95 on The Billboard Hot 100 music chart. It can also be found in the soundtrack to Bad Boys II.  The lead single that was released was "What We Do", which featured Beanie Sigel & Jay Z. The single debuted at #97 on The Billboard 100 music charts. Most of the songs were produced by Just Blaze while some were produced by Bink! & Kanye West.

Critical reception
The album received positive reviews and on Metacritic the album gathered a score of 74 out of 100 based on 7 reviews.

Commercial performance
The album debuted and peaked at number 5 on the Billboard Top 200, selling 132,000 copies in its first week.  The album sold over 500,000 copies, in the United States.

Track listing

Samples
Free
"Freeway Song" by Vicki Sue Robinson
What We Do
"I Just Can't See Myself Without You" by Creative Source
All My Life
"(Man, Oh Man) I Want to Go Back" by The Impressions
Don't Cross The Line
"To Get Love You Must Give Love" by T.U.M.E.
On My Own
"Just Enough Room for Storage" by James Brown
Life
"Life For The Taking" by Eddie Money
Victim Of The Ghetto
"We Belong Together" by The Spinners
You Don't Know (In The Ghetto)
"Inside My Love" by Minnie Ripperton
Alright
"Mystic Brew" by Ronnie Foster
Hear The Song
"Will You Cry (When You Hear This Song)" by Chic
Turn Out the Lights (Freewest)
"You Just Don't Care" by Santana

Charts

Weekly charts

Year-end charts

References

2003 debut albums
Freeway (rapper) albums
Albums produced by Kanye West
Albums produced by Just Blaze
Albums produced by Bink (record producer)
Def Jam Recordings albums
Roc-A-Fella Records albums